Leslie '89 is a cantopop album by Leslie Cheung released in 1989 by Cinepoly Records of Hong Kong.  It was also his supposed penultimate album before the final album Final Encounter (he had planned for retirement from the Cantopop music scene, although he made a return in 1995) also released in 1989. It is also sometimes known as 側面 or Side Face.

Popular songs from this album include 由零開始  'Starting From Zero',   烈火燈蛾  'Fire Moths',  側面  'Side Face',  偏心  'Biased',  需要你  'Need You', and  放蕩  'Wild'. 'Side Face' won the Jade Solid Gold Award for 1989.

Leslie Cheung albums
1989 albums
Cinepoly Records albums